Trischalis splendens is a moth in the family Erebidae. It was described by Rob de Vos and Henricus Jacobus Gerardus van Mastrigt in 2007. It is found in Papua, Indonesia.

References

Moths described in 2007
Nudariina